Casa Vanoni is a historic Art Nouveau building located on via Spadari #7 in Milan, Italy.

History 
It was designed by Achille Manfredini in the Liberty style and built between 1907 and 1908.

Description 
The facade sports fanciful lintels, often dissociated from function. Along the roofline are leonine masks. The building is also notable for the wrought iron balustrades with complex swirling motifs. The four story apartment complex  rises alongside the also Liberty-style Casa Ferrario and Casa Giovini, and facing the Casa dell'Unione Cooperativa. 

A number of Casa Vanoni were constructed in Milan, the building on via A. Saffi 4, no longer has traces of the Alfredo Menni's 1903 design, but a distinct Casa Vanoni-Tarolli (1902), also designed by Menni decorated with a frescoed facade in Liberty style, is found on Via Francesco Petrarca #16.

Gallery

Notes

Art Nouveau architecture in Milan
Houses completed in 1908
Buildings and structures in Milan
1908 establishments in Italy